Bad Boll is a municipality in the district of Göppingen in Baden-Württemberg, Germany.

History
In 1321, the County of Württemberg purchased title over Bad Boll and came to possess it de jure, but it was de facto still controlled by a local priory. That changed with the conversion of the then Duchy of Württemberg to Lutheranism and the seizure of church property. Since 1321, Bad Boll has been placed under the jurisdiction of Göppingen. The hot springs around Bad Boll were discovered in 1595. That spa was rebuilt and expanded from 1823 to 1825. Eckwälden was incorporated into Bad Boll in 1933. The first Evangelical Academy in Germany was established in Bad Boll in 1945. Bad Boll changed its name from Boll to Bad Boll in 2007.

Geography
The municipality (Gemeinde) of Bad Boll is found towards the western periphery of the district of Göppingen in Baden-Württemberg, one of the 16 States of the Federal Republic of Germany.

A portion of the Federally-protected  nature reserve is located in Bad Boll's municipal area.

Politics
Bad Boll has one borough (Ortsteile), Boll, and two villages: Bad Boll and Eckwälden. Bad Boll is part of an municipal association with the municipalities of Aichelberg, Dürnau, Gammelshausen, Hattenhofen, and Zell unter Aichelberg.

Coat of arms
The fountain is a reference to the local hot springs and the stag antler to Württemberg. The Federal Ministry of the Interior awarded this coat of arms and a municipal flag to Bad Boll on 25 January 1961.

Transportation
Bad Boll is connected to Germany's network of roadways by its local Landesstraßen and Kreisstraßen, which join the Bundesautobahn 8 at Aichelberg.

References

External links

  (in German)

Göppingen (district)
Spa towns in Germany